The former CPF Building was a high-rise skyscraper located in the central business district of Singapore. The tower was located on 79 Robinson Road, in the Shenton Way and Tanjong Pagar zone. The building was near several other skyscrapers such as OUE Downtown, Robinson 77 and Capital Tower, which are all about 100 metres away from the building's former site.

It housed the headquarters of the Central Provident Fund Board (CPF).

History
The CPF Building was designed by the Public Works Department of Singapore. The building was completed by 1976. Other firms involved in the development includes Lalesse Gevelliften BV (KONE Lalesse Gevelliftinstallaties), and the CPF. The building was reclad in 2001.

Protests
On 12 August 2005, a rare demonstration by four people demanding greater transparency and accountability in Singapore's state-managed pension fund and other government-linked agencies. The two men and two women assembled at lunchtime outside the CPF building in the central business district, Robinson Road, Singapore. They claimed they did not need a permit and staged their protest for about an hour. However, soon a dozen anti-riot police wearing helmets and knee-high protective gear and carrying shields and batons forced them to disperse.

Architecture
The CPF Building exhibits the International architectural style. Similar in design to DBS Building Tower One, the main materials used in its construction are aluminium reinforced concrete, glass and granite. The structural types applied in its development are cantilever, with a concrete core.

Demolition
In November 2015, the building was sold to Ascendas Land (now CapitaLand) for S$550 million. The last tenant moved out on 20 February 2017.

The building was demolished and will be redeveloped into a 29-storey office tower, slated to be completed in 2020.  While AXA Tower has since become the tallest building ever voluntarily demolished outside of New York City CPF Building remains the tallest building ever voluntarily demolished and replaced by a shorter building.

See also
List of tallest buildings in Singapore
List of tallest voluntarily demolished buildings

References

Demolished buildings and structures in Singapore
Buildings and structures completed in 1976
Buildings and structures demolished in 2017
Raffles Place
Downtown Core (Singapore)
Skyscraper office buildings in Singapore
Brutalist architecture in Singapore
Former skyscrapers